Shipwreck Island may refer to:

Shipwreck Island, a water park in Jacksonville Beach, Florida
Shipwreck Island, a fictional island from the Pirates of the Caribbean series

See also
 Shipwrecked: The Island, a British reality television series